This is a complete list of Members of Parliament elected to the Parliament of the United Kingdom at the 1950 general election, held on 23 February 1950.

Notable newcomers to the House of Commons included Edward Heath, Horace King, Fred Mulley, Bernard Braine, Harry Hylton-Foster, Iain Macleod, Gerald Nabarro, Reginald Maudling, Robert Carr, Bill Deedes, Enoch Powell, David Ormsby-Gore, Christopher Soames, Anthony Crosland, and Jo Grimond.

Composition
These representative diagrams show the composition of the parties in the 1950 general election.

Note: This is not the official seating plan of the House of Commons, which has five rows of benches on each side, with the government party to the right of the Speaker and opposition parties to the left, but with room for only around two-thirds of MPs to sit at any one time.

 The National Liberals, (Scottish) Unionists and Ulster Unionists were in alliance with the Conservatives, bringing total Conservative strength to 298 seats.

× MacManaway was disqualified for being a Church of Ireland priest. A by-election was held in November 1950.
ł Polling in Moss Side took place on 9 March after the Conservative candidate, Sqn. Ldr. Fleming, died before polling day. Florence Horsbrugh had previously stood in the main election in Midlothian and Peebles.

By-elections 
See the list of United Kingdom by-elections.

See also
 List of parliaments of the United Kingdom
 UK general election, 1950
 :Category:UK MPs 1950–1951

References

 The Times House of Commons 1950 (1950)

1950
1950 United Kingdom general election
 List
UK MPs